Felicia Zhang (born September 22, 1993) is an American former pair skater. With Nathan Bartholomay, she is a two-time U.S. national medalist (silver in 2014, bronze in 2013) and competed at the 2014 Winter Olympics.

Personal life 
Felicia Zhang was born in New York City and grew up in Plainsboro Township, New Jersey. Her mother, a doctor's receptionist, and father, a computer information technology worker, are both from Beijing, China. After graduating in 2011 from West Windsor-Plainsboro High School South, she began studying at the University of South Florida, majoring in psychology.

Career

Early years and single skating 
Zhang started skating at the age of seven after attending a skating birthday party. In singles, Zhang won the novice bronze medal at the 2008 U.S. Championships, and placed sixth on the junior level at the 2010 U.S. Championships.

Partnership with Toth 
Zhang teamed up with Taylor Toth in 2009. They won the junior gold medal at the 2010 U.S. Championships. They finished 9th at the 2010 World Junior Championships.

Zhang/Toth moved up to the senior level for the 2010–11 season and competed in the Grand Prix at Skate America, where they finished 7th, and Trophée Eric Bompard, where they finished 5th. They withdrew from the 2011 U.S. Championships due to Zhang's rib injuries. On March 10, 2011, Zhang and Toth announced they had parted ways. During their partnership, they were coached by Jeff DiGregorio in Newark, Delaware.

Partnership with Bartholomay 
Zhang teamed up with Nathan Bartholomay by May 2011. They are coached by Jim Peterson and Lyndon Johnston at the Ice and Sports Complex in Ellenton, Florida. In their first season, they were eighth at the U.S. Championships.

Zhang/Bartholomay won bronze at the 2013 U.S. Championships and were assigned to the 2013 Four Continents Championships where they placed fourth.

In the 2013–14 season, Zhang/Bartholomay received two Grand Prix assignments, the 2013 Skate America and 2013 Cup of China, finishing 7th and 6th. After winning the silver medal at the 2014 U.S. Championships, ahead of Caydee Denney / John Coughlin, they were named in the U.S. team to the Olympics and listed as first alternates for the World Championships. Zhang/Bartholomay finished 12th at the 2014 Winter Olympics in Sochi. They were called up to replace the injured Denney/Coughlin at the 2014 World Championships. They announced the end of their partnership on July 16, 2014.

Programs

With Bartholomay

With Toth

Single skating

Competitive highlights 
GP: Grand Prix; JGP: Junior Grand Prix

Pair skating with Bartholomay

Pair skating with Toth

Single skating

References

External links 

 
 Felicia Zhang / Nathan Bartholomay at Ice Network
 
 

American female pair skaters
American female single skaters
1993 births
Living people
Sportspeople from the Bronx
American sportspeople of Chinese descent
People from Plainsboro Township, New Jersey
Sportspeople from Middlesex County, New Jersey
West Windsor-Plainsboro High School South alumni
Figure skaters at the 2014 Winter Olympics
Olympic figure skaters of the United States
21st-century American women